Sukhanov is a Russian masculine surname, its feminine counterpart is Sukhanova. It may refer to
Alexander Sukhanov (born 1952), Russian poet, composer, bard and mathematician 
Dmitri Sukhanov, Russian figure skater
Eduard Sukhanov (born 1991), Russian football player 
Nikolai Sukhanov (1882–1940), Russian Menshevik 
Maksim Sukhanov (born 1963), Russian actor

Russian-language surnames